Government House is the official residence of the governor of Montserrat, located in Woodlands in Montserrat.

The original Government House, located in Plymouth, was abandoned when Plymouth was evacuated in 1995, due to activity from the Soufrière Hills volcano. The original Government House building is still standing, although it is in a state of considerable disrepair. The current Government House is a modern construction situated in extensive gardens.

As well as being the residence of the Governor of Montserrat, Government House is used for national and ceremonial functions, as well as receptions and meetings with foreign dignitaries and heads of state. It is also the official residence of the head of state of Montserrat (currently King Charles III) when staying in Montserrat.

See also
 Government House – elsewhere in the Commonwealth or British Overseas Territories
 Government Houses of the British Empire and Commonwealth

References

External links
 Information on Government House from the Governor of Montserrat's office

Official residences
Government Houses of the British Empire and Commonwealth
Government buildings in Montserrat